The Hospital Universitario San Ignacio is a 4th level university hospital in Bogotá, Colombia. It is located within campus of the Pontificia Universidad Javeriana and is home to this school's faculties of Medicine, Nursing and Dentistry. The hospital serves nearly all fields in medical expertise and has been home to several recognised physicians including neurologist Rodolfo Llinás and anesthesiologist Alejandro Jadad. Its ample resources and serving the Downtown and northeast areas of the capital city make it an important referral centre in all fields.

History

Recognition 
The Hospital Universitario San Ignacio was recently ranked third best hospital in Colombia, according to the National Ministry of Social Protection.

Departments 
Anaesthesiology (Director: Fritz Gempeler, MD)
Cardiology (Director: Ricardo Bohórquez, MD)
Dermatology
Endocrinology (Director: Ana María Gómez, MD)
Epidemiology
Gastroenterology (Director: Albis Hani, MD)
Genetics (Director: Jaime Bernal, MD)
Geriatrics (Director: Carlos A. Cano, MD)
Hemato-oncology
Infectious diseases (Director: Carlos Álvarez, MD)
Internal Medicine (Director: Ricardo Bohórquez, MD)
Mental Health (Director: Carlos Gómez-Restrepo, MD)
Nephrology (Director: Roberto d'Achiardy, MD)
Neurosciences (Director: Felipe Pretelt, MD)
Nutrition and diet
OB/Gyn (Director: Jaime Luis Silva, MD)
Ophthalmology (Director: Giovanni Castaño, MD)
Orthopaedics (Director: Luis Fernando Useche, MD)
ORL (Director: Santiago Gutiérrez, MD)
Paediatrics
Plastic Surgery
Pneumology (Director: Jully Sanchez, MD)
Radiology
Rheumatology (Director: Juan M. Gutiérrez, MD)
Sleep Medicine (Director: Patricia Hidalgo, MD)
Surgery (Director: Mauricio Peláez, MD)
Transplant Unit (Director: Héctor Pulido, MD)
Urology (Director: Juan G. Cataño MD)

Annex facilities 
The HUSI works jointly with two leading centres in the field of oncology and genetics. These are:

Centro Javeriano de Oncología (Director: Francisco Henao, MD)
The CJO is the most modern cancer specialised facility in Colombia, offering diagnostic as well as therapeutic alternatives relying on the centre's two linear accelerators. Potential uses including radiosurgery, radiotherapy, brachytherapy and chemotherapy are in service. It serves approx. 150 radiotherapy patients/day, 40 chemotherapy patients/day and 150 consults/day.

Instituto de Genética Humana (Director: Juanita Angel Uribe, MD, PhD)
The IGH offers research for patients in the field of inherited metabolic diseases, familial cancer and other genetic or inherited disorders, via cytogenetic analyses and biochemical testing. It is located behind the hospital, beside the Medical School's morphology dept.

Consulta Externa
The outpatient service atop the annex parking facilities has over 20 rooms, some of which are conditioned for several specialties (High-risk pregnancy care, urology among others).

Faculty of medicine and student life 

Students are expected to begin working in the hospital starting 5th semester (3rd year). At this point rotations for semioloy require only 2-3h daily practise. However, starting 6th semester and onward, students must work in the hospital permanently in the various rotations according to the specialty (as long as they are not rotating in other hospitals). This also requires 12- to 24-hour night rounds.

For this purpose, the hospital has conditioned a student area on the 6th floor, with over 60 bunkbeds divided into 12 rooms (each with its own toilet and shower), a TV room, lockers and study rooms. Further improvements are expected soon.

See also 
Pontificia Universidad Javeriana
Pontificia Universidad Javeriana Faculty of Medicine

References

External links 
 Official website of the HUSI
 Official website of the Pontificia Universidad Javeriana - Faculty of Medicine 

Hospital buildings completed in 1953
Hospitals in Colombia
Medical education in Colombia
Teaching hospitals
Hospitals established in 1953
Buildings and structures in Bogotá